Pseudonocardia hispaniensis is a bacterium from the genus of Pseudonocardia which has been isolated from a wastewater treatment plant in Palos de la Frontera in Spain.

References

Pseudonocardia
Bacteria described in 2013